What a Blonde is a 1945 American screwball comedy film directed by Leslie Goodwins and starring Leon Errol, Richard Lane, Michael St. Angel, and Elaine Riley. The screenplay, by Charles Roberts, was based on a story by Oscar Brodney. The film was released by RKO Radio Pictures on January 27, 1945.

Plot

After running out of gas coupons due to wartime rationing, a lingerie tycoon (Leon Errol), must carpool with two other people in order to receive more. So, when he invites one of his new employees (Michael St. Angel) and a showgirl (Veda Ann Borg) to be his “riders” a whole series of misunderstandings ensue when a bunch of chorus girls move into the tycoon's mansion and takeover everything.

Cast
 Leon Errol	as F. Farrington Fowler
 Richard Lane as Pomeroy
 Michael St. Angel as Andrew Kent
 Elaine Riley as Cynthia Richards
 Veda Ann Borg as Pat Campbell
 Lydia Bilbrook as Mrs. Fowler
 Clarence Kolb as Charles DaFoe
 Ann Shoemaker as Mrs. DaFoe
 Chef Milani as Tony Gugliemi
 Emory Parnell as McPherson - A1

References

External links
 
 
 
 

1945 films
American black-and-white films
1940s screwball comedy films
American screwball comedy films
Films scored by Leigh Harline
RKO Pictures films
Films directed by Leslie Goodwins
1940s American films